The Ancient Monuments Protection Act 1910 was an Act of the Parliament of the United Kingdom that aimed to improve the protection afforded to ancient monuments in Britain.

Details

The Ancient Monuments Protection Act 1882 had begun the process of establishing legal protection for some of Britain's ancient monuments; these had all been prehistoric sites, such as ancient tumuli. The Ancient Monuments Protection Act 1900 had continued this process, empowering the government's Commissioners of Works and local county councils to protect a wider range of properties. In 1908 a royal commission concluded that there were gaps between these two pieces of legislation, and in 1910 the Ancient Monuments Protection Act was passed, allowing the commissioners and councils to receive ancient monuments as gifts, and making damaging the wider set of ancient monuments described in 1900 legislation a criminal offence in the same way as those covered by the 1882 legislation.

Consequences

The operation of the combined legislation was felt to be unwieldy, and three years later the act was repealed, being replaced with the Ancient Monuments Consolidation and Amendment Act 1913.

Bibliography

Mynors, Charles. (2006) Listed Buildings, Conservation Areas and Monuments. London: Sweet and Maxwell. .

References

United Kingdom Acts of Parliament 1910
Archaeology of the United Kingdom
Archaeology law
Conservation in the United Kingdom